Thomas Michael Brown (born December 6, 1927) is an American former professional baseball player. He made his Major League Baseball (MLB) debut with his hometown Brooklyn Dodgers at 16 years and 241 days old, starting at shortstop at Ebbets Field against the Chicago Cubs, on August 3, 1944, during the World War II manpower shortage. Brown thus became the youngest non-pitcher to ever play in a major league game, and the second-youngest overall after Joe Nuxhall, who was 15 years and 316 days old when he first appeared as a hurler for the Cincinnati Reds on June 10, 1944. In Brown's debut game, he collected his first big-league hit, a double off the Cubs' Bob Chipman, and in the field handled three chances, with one error, as the Dodgers fell, 6–2.

The Brooklyn native had signed with the Dodgers after a 1943 tryout and spent the first four months of the 1944 season with Newport News of the Class B Piedmont League; while there, Brown collected 101 hits and a league-leading 11 triples, and batted .297 before his recall to Brooklyn in August. He appeared in 46 games for the Dodgers through the end of that season. The following year, 1945, Brown batted .286, with ten home runs, in 85 games, playing in the top-level American Association, and appeared in another 57 contests for Brooklyn, becoming a 103-game big-league veteran before his 18th birthday. He became the youngest player ever to hit a home run in the major leagues on August 20, 1945, at the age of 17.

Brown spent 1946 in the United States Army, then in 1947, the second postwar season, returned to a Dodgers team with a set lineup that included Baseball Hall of Fame shortstop Pee Wee Reese. He became a utility man for the remainder of his MLB career, appearing in 166 games as a shortstop, 94 as an outfielder, 50 as a third baseman, 24 as a second baseman, and 21 as a first baseman. The Dodgers traded Brown to the Philadelphia Phillies in June 1951, and the Phils sold his contract to the Chicago Cubs a little more than a year later.

As a hitter, Brown batted over .300 twice in part-time duty (1949 and 1952). On September 18, 1950, against the Cubs at Ebbets Field, Brown hit three home runs and a single, with a base on balls, in five plate appearances, scoring three runs and collecting five runs batted in (RBI). The Dodgers, however, lost the game, 9–7.

Brown's big-league career came to an end September 25, 1953, as a member of the Cubs; he had played in 494 games during all or parts of nine National League (NL) seasons, and was 25 years of age. Brown's 309 MLB hits included 39 doubles, seven triples, and 31 homers. He hit .241 lifetime with 159 runs batted in. Brown appeared as a pinch hitter in the 1949 World Series and went hitless in two at bats, as Brooklyn fell to the New York Yankees in five games. He played minor league baseball through 1959 before retiring.

References

External links

Tommy Brown at Baseball Library
Tommy Brown at Pura Pelota (Venezuelan Professional Baseball League statistics)

1927 births
Living people
United States Army soldiers
Brooklyn Dodgers players
Chattanooga Lookouts players
Chicago Cubs players
Industriales de Valencia players
Los Angeles Angels (minor league) players
Major League Baseball shortstops
Nashville Vols players
New Orleans Pelicans (baseball) players
Newport News Dodgers players
Philadelphia Phillies players
St. Paul Saints (AA) players
Sportspeople from Brooklyn
Baseball players from New York City